Jiří Chamrád (born 19 June 1954) is a Czech athlete. He competed in the men's hammer throw at the 1980 Summer Olympics.

References

1954 births
Living people
Athletes (track and field) at the 1980 Summer Olympics
Czech male hammer throwers
Olympic athletes of Czechoslovakia
Sportspeople from Ostrava